Cajarc is a commune in the Lot department, Occitania, France.

It is a stopping place on the Via podiensis, the medieval pilgrimage route from Le Puy-en-Velay to Santiago de Compostela, but also attracts tourists on account of its medieval town centre, its plan d'eau, a 4 km-long dammed section of the river Lot, and its beautiful setting in the Lot valley and the surrounding limestone plains (le causse). Its major cultural event is Africajarc, a four-day festival of contemporary African music and culture which runs in the last week of July each year; in 2008 it celebrated its tenth anniversary.

Notable people
Cajarc was the birthplace of playwright, novelist and screenwriter Françoise Sagan (1935–2004) born Françoise Quoirez.

President of France Georges Pompidou was an MP for the area in the National Assembly.

See also
Communes of the Lot department

References

Communes of Lot (department)
Quercy